The 1985 Cologne Cup, also known as the Cologne Grand Prix, was a men's tennis tournament played on indoor carpet courts in Cologne, West Germany that was part of the 1985 Nabisco Grand Prix circuit. It was the tenth edition of the tournament and was held from 21 October through 27 October 1985. Unseeded Peter Lundgren won the singles title.

Finals

Singles
 Peter Lundgren defeated  Ramesh Krishnan 6–3, 6–2
 It was Lundgren's first singles title of his career.

Doubles
 Alex Antonitsch /  Michiel Schapers defeated  Jan Gunnarsson /  Joakim Nyström 6–4, 7–5

References

External links
 ITF tournament edition details

Cologne Cup
Cologne Cup